Noel L. Owen is a professor of chemistry at Brigham Young University who served from 1995 to 2001 as associate chair of the Chemistry and Biochemistry Department.  He is also a member of BYU's Cancer Research Center.

Owen holds a bachelor's degree from the University of Wales and a Ph.D. from the University of Cambridge.  He did post-doctoral work at Harvard University.

Owen is a molecular spectroscopist.  Articles co-authored by Owen have been published in Nature, and in many chemistry journals.

Sources
BYU bio
BYU Studies article by Owen

Converts to Mormonism
Welsh Latter Day Saints
Alumni of the University of Wales
Welsh chemists
Welsh emigrants to the United States
Brigham Young University faculty
Living people
Alumni of the University of Cambridge
Year of birth missing (living people)